This is a list of diplomatic missions of Somalia, excluding honorary consulates. Foreign relations of Somalia are handled primarily by the President as the head of state, the Prime Minister as the head of government, and the Minister of Foreign Affairs of the Federal Government.

According to Article 54 of the national constitution, the allocation of powers and resources between the Federal Government and the Federal Republic of Somalia's constituent Federal Member States shall be negotiated and agreed upon by the Federal Government and the Federal Member States, except in matters pertaining to foreign affairs, national defense, citizenship and immigration, and monetary policy. Article 53 also stipulates that the Federal Government shall consult the Federal Member States on major issues related to international agreements, including negotiations vis-a-vis foreign trade, finance and treaties.

Somaliland, a self-declared sovereign state that is internationally recognised as an autonomous region of Somalia, maintains consulate-level informal relations with some foreign governments. However, its self-proclaimed independence remains unrecognised by any country or international organisation.

Current missions

Africa

Americas

Asia

Europe

Multilateral organizations

Gallery

Closed missions

Africa

Asia

Europe

See also
Foreign relations of Somalia
List of diplomatic missions in Somalia
Visa policy of Somalia

Notes

References

External links
Ministry of Foreign Affairs and Investment Promotion of Somalia

Diplomatic missions
Somalia
Diplomatic missions